Abraham de Oliveira (4 May 1880 – 26 March 1943) was a Dutch gymnast who competed in the 1908 Summer Olympics. He was part of the Dutch gymnastics team, which finished seventh in the team event.

He was murdered in the Sobibor extermination camp.

References

1880 births
1943 deaths
Dutch Sephardi Jews
Dutch male artistic gymnasts
Jewish Dutch sportspeople
Gymnasts at the 1908 Summer Olympics
Olympic gymnasts of the Netherlands
Sephardi Jews who died in the Holocaust
Gymnasts from Amsterdam
Dutch civilians killed in World War II
Dutch people who died in Sobibor extermination camp